Hundred Quarters is a neighbourhood in the Korangi District in eastern Karachi, Pakistan. It was previously part of Korangi Town, which was an administrative unit that was disbanded in 2011. There are one hundred houses (also known as quarters) in this neighbourhood. It is divided into many sectors such as sector D-AREA, E- AREA, B-AREA C-AREA.

Demographics
It is a Muhajirs majority area.

References

External links 
 Karachi Website.

Neighbourhoods of Karachi
Korangi Town